Notorious is the debut studio album by American rapper and producer Donald D. It was released in 1989 via Ice-T's  Records label with distribution through Epic Records and CBS Records Inc. Recording sessions took place at Syndicate Studio West and Wide Tracks Recording Studio in Los Angeles, California. Record production on the album was handled by Afrika Islam and Donald D, with executive production provided by Ice-T. Reaching a peak position of number 78 on the Top R&B/Hip-Hop Albums, the album remained on the chart for a total of 18 weeks. It spawned two singles: "F.B.I.", which peaked at number 8 on the Hot Rap Songs, and "Notorious".

Track listing 

Sample credits
 Track 1 contains elements from "Somebody Else's Guy" by Jocelyn Brown (1984), "The Grunt" by The J.B.'s (1970) and "Test of the Emergency Broadcast System" by Don Pardo (1985)
 Track 2 contains elements from "Soul Vibrations" by Kool & the Gang (1972), "A Funky Song" by Ripple (1973) and "Givin' Up Food for Funk" by The J.B.'s (1972)
 Track 3 contains elements from "Blow Your Head" by Fred Wesley & The J.B.'s (1974), "Synthetic Substitution" by Melvin Bliss (1973), "White Lines (Don't Don't Do It)" by Grandmaster Melle Mel (1983) and "Looking for the Perfect Beat" by Afrika Bambaataa & Soulsonic Force (1983)
 Track 4 contains elements from "Gotta Get Away" by Flaming Ember (1971)
 Track 5 contains elements from "Pick Up the Pieces One by One" by A.A.B.B. (1975), "It's Yours" by T La Rock & Jazzy Jay (1984) and "The Syndicate" by Ice-T (1988)
 Track 6 contains elements from "Ramble On" by Led Zeppelin (1969)
 Track 7 contains elements from "Unwind Yourself" by Marva Whitney (1967), "Bring the Noise" by Public Enemy (1987) and "Mighty Mighty" by Earth, Wind & Fire (1974)
 Track 8 contains elements from "Joyous" by Pleasure (1977), "Razor Blade" by Little Royal & the Swingmasters (1972) and "Get Up, Get Into It, Get Involved" by James Brown (1970)
 Track 9 contains elements from "Shake It (Do the 61st)" by Anquette (1987) and "It's Yours" by T La Rock & Jazzy Jay (1984)
 Track 10 contains elements from "You Can Have Watergate Just Gimme Some Bucks and I'll Be Straight" by Fred Wesley & The J.B.'s (1973) and "Brother Green (The Disco King)" by Roy Ayers Ubiquity (1975)
 Track 11 contains elements from "Sing a Simple Song" by Sly & the Family Stone (1968)
 Track 12 contains elements from "If You've Got It, You'll Get It" by The Headhunters (1975)

Personnel 
 Donald Lamont – main artist, producer, arranger
 Tracy Lauren Marrow – featured artist (track 10), executive producer
 Charles Andre Glenn – producer, programming (tracks: 1–5, 7-9)
 Johnny Rivers – programming (tracks: 6, 11)
 DJ Chilly-D – programming (tracks: 10, 12), scratches
 Vachik Aghaniantz – mixing
 Tom Baker – mastering
 Glen E. Friedman – photography
 Tony Sellari – artwork
 Robert Joseph Pfeifer – A&R
 Jorge Hinojosa – management
 Cara Lewis – booking

Charts

References

External links 
 

1989 debut albums
Albums produced by Afrika Islam
Epic Records albums